Andriy Valeriyovych Ponyedyelnik (born 28 February 1997) is a Ukrainian professional footballer who plays as a right winger for Ukrainian club Kryvbas Kryvyi Rih.

References

External links
 
 

1997 births
Living people
Ukrainian footballers
Sportspeople from Volyn Oblast
Association football forwards
FC Nyva Ternopil players
FC Krystal Chortkiv players
FC Bukovyna Chernivtsi players
FC Kalush players
FC Polissya Zhytomyr players
FC Hirnyk-Sport Horishni Plavni players
FC Kryvbas Kryvyi Rih players
Ukrainian Premier League players
Ukrainian First League players
Ukrainian Second League players